"If You Say the Word" is a song recorded by the English rock band Radiohead, released on 7 September 2021 as the first single from their compilation album Kid A Mnesia. It was recorded during the joint sessions for Radiohead's fourth and fifth albums, Kid A (2000) and Amnesiac (2001), but remained unreleased until 2021.

Music
"If You Say the Word" features "delicate" fingerpicking, a "foreboding groove", "chiming" percussion and ondes Martenot.

Music video
Radiohead released a video for "If You Say the Word" on 23 September 2021. It was directed by Kasper Häggström and features a crew capturing businessmen from nature and taking them to work in London. Spin likened the video to the science fiction series Black Mirror. The video won "Best Alternative Video" at the 2022 UK Music Video Awards.

Reception
Reviewing "If You Say the Word" for Pitchfork, Marc Hogan described it as "lush and elegant". He observed the lyrics that seem both loving and threatening, and wrote, "While 'If You Say the Word' doesn't immediately stand out as fodder for a Radiohead best-of playlist, it's still of such strikingly high quality that it's surprising it hasn't surfaced before now". Contact Music described it as a "typically melancholy ambient number" in line with other material from Kid A and Amnesiac.

Personnel

Radiohead
Colin Greenwood 
Jonny Greenwood 
Ed O'Brien 
Philip Selway
Thom Yorke

Additional personnel
 Nigel Godrich production, engineering, mixing
 Gerard Navarro production assistance, additional engineering
 Graeme Stewart additional engineering

References

2021 songs
Radiohead songs
Song recordings produced by Nigel Godrich
Songs written by Thom Yorke
Songs written by Jonny Greenwood
Songs written by Colin Greenwood
Songs written by Ed O'Brien
Songs written by Philip Selway
XL Recordings singles